Aleksandr Dokturishivili (Александр Доктуришвили, born 22 May 1980) is a Georgian-Uzbekistani wrestler. In 2004, he won gold medals in the Greco-Roman −74 kg division at the Summer Olympics and Asian Championships.

References

1980 births
Living people
Sportspeople from Tbilisi 
Sportspeople from Tashkent
Male sport wrestlers from Georgia (country)
Olympic wrestlers of Uzbekistan
Wrestlers at the 2004 Summer Olympics
Olympic gold medalists for Uzbekistan
Olympic medalists in wrestling
Wrestlers at the 2006 Asian Games
Medalists at the 2004 Summer Olympics
Uzbekistani male sport wrestlers
Asian Games competitors for Uzbekistan
European Wrestling Championships medalists